Photodegradation is the alteration of materials by light. Commonly, the term is used loosely to refer to the combined action of sunlight and air, which cause oxidation and hydrolysis. Often photodegradation is intentionally avoided, since it destroys paintings and other artifacts. It is, however, partly responsible for remineralization of biomass and is used intentionally in some disinfection technologies. Photodegradation does not apply to how materials may be aged or degraded via infrared light or heat, but does include degradation in all of the ultraviolet light wavebands.

Applications

Foodstuffs
The protection of food from photodegradation is very important. Some nutrients, for example, are affected by degradation when exposed to sunlight. In the case of beer, UV radiation causes a process that entails the degradation of hop bitter compounds to 3-methyl-2-buten-1-thiol and therefore changes the taste. As amber-colored glass has the ability to absorb UV radiation, beer bottles are often made from such glass to prevent this process.

Paints, inks, and dyes 

Paints, inks, and dyes that are organic are more susceptible to photodegradation than those that are not. Ceramics are almost universally colored with non-organic origin materials so as to allow the material to resist photodegradation even under the most relentless conditions, maintaining its color.

Pesticides and herbicides 
The photodegradation of pesticides is of great interest because of the scale of agriculture and the intensive use of chemicals. Pesticides are however selected in part not to photodegrade readily in sunlight in order to allow them to exert their biocidal activity. Thus, more modalities are implemented to enhance their photodegradation, including the use of photosensitizers, photocatalysts (e.g., titanium dioxide), and the addition of reagents such as hydrogen peroxide that would generate hydroxyl radicals that would attack the pesticides.

Pharmaceuticals
The photodegradation of pharmaceuticals is of interest because they are found in many water supplies. They have deleterious effects on aquatic organisms including toxicity, endocrine disruption, genetic damage. But also in the primary packaging material the photodegradation of pharmaceuticals has to be prevented. For this, amber glasses like Fiolax amber and Corning 51-L are commonly used to protect the pharmaceutical from UV radiations. Iodine (in the form of Lugol's solution) and colloidal silver are universally used in packaging that lets through very little UV light so as to avoid degradation.

Polymers

Common synthetic polymers that can be attacked include polypropylene and LDPE, where tertiary carbon bonds in their chain structures are the centres of attack. Ultraviolet rays interact with these bonds to form free radicals, which then react further with oxygen in the atmosphere, producing carbonyl groups in the main chain. The exposed surfaces of products may then discolour and crack, and in extreme cases, complete product disintegration can occur.

UV degradation has been known to cause items made of plastics like the aforementioned polypropylene, as well as polyethylene, and PVC(especially white- or beige-coloured plastic, even though it can affect said plastics regardless of colour), to turn yellow (or brown, if left to degrade for very long periods of time), or a tinge of yellow. This process can be accelerated if the plastic is exposed to high temperatures, and, in addition, the risk of yellowing taking place can be increased by certain additives, like butylated hydroxytoluene (BHT), a commonly-used antioxidant, or brominated flame retardant (BFR), which is used to increase the fire resistance of some materials.

In fibre products like rope used in outdoor applications, product life will be low because the outer fibres will be attacked first, and will easily be damaged by abrasion for example. Discolouration of the rope may also occur, thus giving an early warning of the problem.

Polymers which possess UV-absorbing groups such as aromatic rings may also be sensitive to UV degradation. Aramid fibres like Kevlar, for example, are highly UV-sensitive and must be protected from the deleterious effects of sunlight.

Mechanism

Many organic chemicals are thermodynamically unstable in the presence of oxygen; however, their rate of spontaneous oxidation is slow at room temperature. In the language of physical chemistry, such reactions are kinetically limited. This kinetic stability allows the accumulation of complex environmental structures in the environment. Upon the absorption of light, triplet oxygen converts to singlet oxygen, a highly reactive form of the gas, which effects spin-allowed oxidations. In the atmosphere, the organic compounds are degraded by hydroxyl radicals, which are produced from water and ozone.

Photochemical reactions are initiated by the absorption of a photon, typically in the wavelength range 290–700 nm (at the surface of the Earth). The energy of an absorbed photon is transferred to electrons in the molecule and briefly changes their configuration (i.e., promotes the molecule from a ground state to an excited state). The excited state represents what is essentially a new molecule. Often excited state molecules are not kinetically stable in the presence of O2 or H2O and can spontaneously decompose (oxidize or hydrolyze). Sometimes molecules decompose to produce high energy, unstable fragments that can react with other molecules around them. The two processes are collectively referred to as direct photolysis or indirect photolysis, and both mechanisms contribute to the removal of pollutants.

The United States federal standard for testing plastic for photodegradation is 40 CFR Ch. I (7–1–03 Edition)PART 238

Protection against photodegradation
Photodegradation of plastics and other materials can be inhibited with polymer stabilizers, which are widely used. These additives include antioxidants, which interrupt degradation processes. Typical antioxidants are derivatives of aniline. Another type of additive are UV-absorbers. These agents capture the photon and convert it to heat. Typical UV-absorbers are hydroxy-substituted benzophenones, related to the chemicals used in sunscreen.

There are also several methods which have been discovered over time to reverse the degradation process and restore yellowed plastic. These are commonly used as a way to restore yellowed buttons, cases or other plastic components on vintage electronic devices. This process (often referred to as "retrobrite"), involves getting a bleaching agent (usually hydrogen peroxide, although other chemicals, like chlorine bleach, can be used too) to react with the surface of the plastic (alongside UV light), resulting in the plastic becoming whiter, to varying levels of success. While this is known to work most of the time, the drawback of retrobriting is that, firstly, the results don't always turn out as expected (especially with vibrantly-coloured plastics), and secondly, some methods can cause unintended effects, such as marbling (where the plastic is lighter or darker in some places than others).

See also 
Plastic bag
 Polymer degradation
 UV degradation

References

Sources

Boltres, Bettine, "When glass meets pharma", ECV Editio Cantor, 2015, 

Chemical reactions
Plastics and the environment
Biodegradable waste management
Photochemistry
Light
Molecular biology
Environmental chemistry